The Tamsui Old Street is a street in Tamsui District, New Taipei, Taiwan.

Features
The street is lined with shops selling traditional pastries, A-gei, Iron Eggs, fish balls, fried fish crackers.

There are also prominent century-old Chinese temples like Fuyou Temple (淡水福佑宮) built in 1796 and Qingshui Temple (淡水清水巖) located in this area.

Transportation
The street is accessible within walking distance north west from Tamsui Station of Taipei Metro.

See also
 List of roads in Taiwan
 List of tourist attractions in Taiwan

References

Streets in Taipei